This is a list of electoral results for the Electoral district of Floreat in Western Australian elections.

Members for Floreat

Election results

Elections in the 1990s

Elections in the 1980s

Elections in the 1970s

Elections in the 1960s

References

Western Australian state electoral results by district